Historic RittenhouseTown, sometimes referred to as Rittenhouse Historic District, encompasses the remains of an early industrial community which was the site of the first paper mill in British North America. The mill was built in 1690 by William Rittenhouse and his son Nicholas on the north bank of Paper Mill Run (Monoshone Creek) near (and now within) Philadelphia, Pennsylvania.  The district, off Lincoln Drive near Wissahickon Avenue in Fairmount Park, includes six of up to forty-five original buildings.  RittenhouseTown was listed on the National Register of Historic Places and was designated a National Historic Landmark District on April 27, 1992.

History
Flax was woven into linen in nearby Germantown.  When the linen fabrics wore out, the rags were brought to RittenhouseTown to be made into paper. Paper produced at the Rittenhouse mill was sold to printers in Germantown, Philadelphia, and New York City.  The Rittenhouse paper mill operated until about the 1850s, by which time the family was leasing its facilities out to other types of manufacturing.

Between the years 1890 and 1917, the site was acquired through donations and purchases by the City of Philadelphia's Fairmount Park Commission. A nonprofit organization called Historic RittenhouseTown, Inc. was founded in 1984 to preserve, restore, and historically interpret RittenhouseTown. The organization maintains offices within RittenhouseTown and offers historic tours, paper making workshops and special events.

Description
RittenhouseTown includes six historic buildings maintained by Historic RittenhouseTown: Abraham Rittenhouse Home (c. 1720); Rittenhouse Homestead (1707); Rittenhouse Bake House (c. 1730); Enoch Rittenhouse Home (1845); Jacob Rittenhouse Home (1810); and another unnamed 18th century Rittenhouse Home.  The Rittenhouse Bake House is used for cooking demonstrations. A 20th century barn originally built for the Fairmount Park Commission is now used for paper-making workshops and demonstrations.

Most of RittenhouseTown's buildings are built of stone and finished in stucco, and generally exhibit colonial building methods.  They are all that are left of a much larger industrial complex and worker village, of which more than thirty-five buildings have been demolished.  The area also includes archaeological industrial remains of some of the mill buildings.

See also 

 Awbury Historic District
 Chestnut Hill Historic District
 Colonial Germantown Historic District
 Tulpehocken Station Historic District
 List of National Historic Landmarks in Philadelphia
 National Register of Historic Places listings in Northwest Philadelphia

References

Further reading
Green, James. The Rittenhouse Mill and the Beginnings of Papermaking in America. Philadelphia: Library Company of Philadelphia and Friends of Historic RittenhouseTown, 1990.

External links 
  (NPS) 32 KB
 Historic RittenhouseTown website
 First Paper Mill in British North America
 Listing, photographs, and drawings of the Claus Rittenhouse house at the Historic American Buildings Survey
 Listing, photographs, and drawings of the Claus Rittenhouse home outbuilding at the Historic American Buildings Survey

German-American history
History of Philadelphia
Historic house museums in Philadelphia
Open-air museums in Pennsylvania
National Historic Landmarks in Pennsylvania
National Register of Historic Places in Philadelphia
Industry museums in Pennsylvania
Historic districts in Philadelphia
Philadelphia Register of Historic Places
Germantown, Philadelphia
Historic districts on the National Register of Historic Places in Pennsylvania
Wissahickon Valley Park
Historic House Museums of the Pennsylvania Germans